Tawny emperor is the common name of two species of brush-footed butterflies in the subfamily Apaturinae:
 Asterocampa clyton, native to North America 
 Chitoria ulupi, native to East Asia

Animal common name disambiguation pages